Thiacidas is a genus of moths of the family Noctuidae described by Francis Walker in 1855. Species are distributed throughout India, Sri Lanka and Myanmar.

Description
Palpi porrect (extending forward) and slender, reaching vertex of head. Second joint is hairy. Legs naked with short spurs. Antennae fasciculated in male. Metathorax with a slight tuft. Abdomen with thick woolly hair on dorsum of proximal segments. Tibia hair and spineless. Forewings are longer and narrow with somewhat arched costa towards apex. Hindwings with veins 3 and 4 usually stalked and veins 6 and 7 usually from cell.

Species
 Thiacidas acronictoides (Berio, 1950)
 Thiacidas adnanensis (Wiltshire, 1980)
 Thiacidas alboporphyrea (Pagenstecher, 1907)
 Thiacidas berenice (Fawcett, 1916)
 Thiacidas callipona (Bethune-Baker, 1911)
 Thiacidas cerurodes (Hampson, 1916)
 Thiacidas cerurodes asiriensis Hacker & Fibiger, 2002
 Thiacidas cerurodes cerurodes Hampson, 1916
 Thiacidas cookei (Pinhey, 1958)
 Thiacidas duplicata (Grünberg, 1910)
 Thiacidas egregia Staudinger, 1892
 Thiacidas fasciata (Fawcett, 1917)
 Thiacidas fractilinea Pinhey, 1968
 Thiacidas fuscomacula Hacker & Zilli, 2010
 Thiacidas hampsoni (Hacker, 2004)
 Thiacidas intermedia Hacker & Zilli, 2007
 Thiacidas ivoiriana Hacker & Zilli, 2010
 Thiacidas juvenis Hacker & Zilli, 2007
 Thiacidas kanoensis Hacker & Zilli, 2007
 Thiacidas khomasana Mey, 2011
 Thiacidas krooni Hacker & Zilli, 2007
 Thiacidas legraini Hacker & Zilli, 2007
 Thiacidas leonie Hacker & Zilli, 2007
 Thiacidas meii Hacker & Zilli, 2007
 Thiacidas morettoi Hacker & Zilli, 2010
 Thiacidas mukim (Berio, 1977)
 Thiacidas nigrimacula (Pinhey, 1968)
 Thiacidas occidentalis Hacker & Zilli, 2010
 Thiacidas orientalis Hacker & Zilli, 2010
 Thiacidas permutata Hacker & Zilli, 2007
 Thiacidas politzari Hacker & Zilli, 2010
 Thiacidas postalbida (Gaede, 1939)
 Thiacidas postica Walker, 1855
 Thiacidas robertbecki Hacker & Zilli, 2007
 Thiacidas roseotincta (Pinhey, 1962)
 Thiacidas roseotincta albata Wiltshire, 1994
 Thiacidas roseotincta roseotincta Pinhey, 1962
 Thiacidas schausi (Hampson, 1905)
 Thiacidas senex (Bethune-Baker, 1911)
 Thiacidas smythi (Gaede, 1939)
 Thiacidas somaliensis Hacker & Zilli, 2010
 Thiacidas stassarti Hacker & Zilli, 2007
 Thiacidas subhampsoni Hacker & Zilli, 2010
 Thiacidas submutata Hacker & Zilli, 2007
 Thiacidas triangulata (Gaede, 1939)

References

 
 Berio (1950). Bollettino della Società entomologica italiana 80: 92.
 Berio (1977). Annali del Museo civico di storia naturale Giacomo Doria (Genova) 81: 338, fig. 24.
 Bethune-Baker (1911). Annals and Magazine of Natural History Serie 8(8): 533–534.
 Fawcett (1916). Proceedings of the Zoological Society of Londonon 1916: 717, pl. 1, fig. 15.
 Fawcett (1917). Proceedings of the Zoological Society of Londonon 1917: 123.
 Gaede (1939). Die Gross-Schmetterlinge der Erde 15: 288.
 Grünberg (1910). in Schultze. Zoologische und anthropologische Ergebnisse einer Forschungsreise im westlichen und zentralen Südafrika 4(1): 132.
 Hacker (2004). Esperiana Buchreihe zur Entomologie 1: 274, pl. 13, fig. 6.
 Hacker & Fibiger (2002). Esperiana Buchreihe zur Entomologie 9: 193, pl. 6, fig. 18
 Hacker & Zilli (2007). Esperiana Buchreihe zur Entomologie 3: 179–246.
 Hampson (1905). Annals and Magazine of Natural History Serie 7(16): 19.
 Hampson (1916). Proceedings of the Zoological Society of London 1916: 129, pl. 1, fig. 43
 Pagenstecher (1907). Reise in Ostafrika in den Jahren 1903-1905 pp. 114, pl. 6, fig. 17.
 Pinhey (1958). Occasional Papers of the National Museums of Southern Rhodesia 22(B): 117, pl. 1.
 Pinhey (1962). Occasional Papers of the National Museums of Southern Rhodesia 3 (B): 872, pl. 2, figs. 6 & 7.
 Pinhey (1968). Annals of the Transvaal Museum 25: 166, pl. 15, figs. 2–4.
 Staudinger (1892). in Romanoff. Mémoires sur les lépidoptères 6: 404, pl.7, fig. 2.
 Walker (1855). List of the Specimens of Lepidopterous Insects in the Collection of the British Museum 5: 1028.
 Wiltshire (1980). Fauna of Saudi Arabia 2: 226, pl. 2, fig. 57.
 Wiltshire (1994). Fauna of Saudi Arabia 14: 125, pl. 17.

 
Noctuidae
Moth genera